The Akyem are an Akan people. The term Akyem (Akem, Akim or Aki) is used to describe a group of four states: Asante Akyem, Akyem Abuakwa, Akyem Kotoku and Akyem Bosome. These nations are located primarily in the eastern region in south Ghana. The term is also used to describe the general area where the Akyem ethnic group clusters. The Akyem ethnic group make up between 3-4 percent of Ghana's population depending on how one defines the group and are very prominent in all aspects of Ghanaian life. The Akyem are a matrilineal people. The history of this ethnic group is that of brave warriors who managed to create a thriving often influential and relatively independent state within modern-day Ghana . When one talks of Ghanaian history, there is often mention of The Big Six. These were six individuals who played a big role in the independence of Ghana. Of the big six, people of Akyem descent made up the majority.

History and genesis of the Akyem states
Akyemmansa is the three traditional areas of Akyem in the eastern region of Ghana. Historically, it has been attested via oral history that the Akyem people were one of the Akan people to migrate south from the Sahel to the area that became Bono state. This area is the origin of modern Akan people. 
A group of Akan people who left Bonoman later formed the Adansi Kingdom in the mid-14th century.
The Adansis were known for their ability to build illustrious structures in their kingdom; hence the name adansi (builders).

In the first half of the 17th century, the area of what is now Ghana was dominated by three states the Guans, Denkyera, the Adansi, and the Akwamu. 
Within the Adansi state there were three military posts in the Western Portion Akyem Abuakwa, Akyem Kotoku, and Akyem Bosome.

Eastern Adansi as an entity lost much of its identity due to conflicts with neighboring states namely the Denkyira and much of it was absorbed in the Denkyira empire.
Thus, during the second half of the 17th century the area which became Ghana was dominated by three states the Remnants of Adansi(Ashanti), Denkyera, Guans, Dagons, Anlos, Ga, Fante, Akyem and Akwamu.

The rising Ashanti Kingdom flourished under the leadership of Otumfuo Nana Osei Tutu, and during their ascendancy assimilated the once powerful Denkyira into the growing empire in the early 18th century. The expansion of Ashanti through its fierce and skilled military might caused the Akyem people who feared Ashanti domination to flee across the River Pra towards newer settlements. Nana Osei Tutu pursued the Kotoku people, the last of the Akyem group left across the River Pra after defeating them in a battle against the advice of the great priest of Asante, Okomfo Anokye, where he died from a Kotoku sniper's bullet crossing the river. This caused the Ashanti Army to abolish their pursuit and turn back to Kumasi the Capital for the King's funeral and installation of a new King. This was on a Thursday; and is remembered as one of the great oath of the Ashantis, "Meka Yawada" (I swear by Thursday), a vow Otumfuo Opoku Ware [(Katakyie), the mighty one] made to avenge the death of his uncle the late King, Osei Tutu. Early in 1717, the British at Cape Coast reported that the "Ashanti and the  Akyem are resolved on a war with each other"; In September, that "a decisive battle was likely between the Ashanti and the  Akyem by which the trade will be opened". In October -of the same year the Dutch factor at Apam, reported that "The Zaay (Ashanti head chief) was dead and that the Ashanti have been defeated by the  Akyem." Five days later, another Dutch report confirmed. Akyem sold large numbers of Asante prisoners of war to the European slavers on the coast. Later battles between Akyem and Ashanti kingdoms were numerous with wins and loses on both sides, these battles would often involve alliances with other tribes and kingdoms. 

The Akyem conquest of Akwamu in 1730 is also recorded as one of the most decisive victories in Gold Coast history, after a conflict with them regarding a controversy involving the Akyem royal family. The event was described by contemporaries as the greatest revolution that had taken place in that part of the world. The Akwamu themselves were responsible for destroying the old Ga kingdom in late seventeen century, and were now forced by the Akyem to flee from their homeland and push across the river Volta where the present Akwamu capital.

18th-century Akyem-Akwamu war

The Akyems, especially the elite forces known as the Abuakwas but also the Kotokus, fought the Akwamus and emerged victorious. In defeating the Akwamu, the Akyem got control of the land the Akwamu had been occupying that belonged to the Ga nation, and the Ga people were allowed more autonomy in their historic lands. Accra came under Akyem rule as they were Akwamu areas. Frimpong Manso of Kotoku and Ba kwante of Abuakwa shared authority over Accra and the Adangbe area. Owusu Akyem, son of a sister of the Okyenhene, became the administrator of the Adangbe area. 
Historian J. K. Fynn writes the following:
The Akyem conquest of Akwamu in 1730 was one of the most decisive victories in Gold Coast history. The event was described by contemporaries as the greatest revolution that had taken place in that part of the world. Since the Akwamu themselves destroyed the old Ga Kingdom in the late seventeenth century.

After the war the Akyem Abuakwas made their temporary capitals in several former Akwamu areas, including Praso, until they finally settled at Pameng. However, it was during the reign of Nana Ofori Panin that the capital of Akyem Abuakwa was finally moved to "Kyebirie" (named after a black hat used by a hunter using the area as his hunting grounds). It is now known as Kyebi.

The victory opened up trade between the Akyem - a nation described as having some of the largest gold deposits - and Europeans on the coast.

Genesis of Akuapem state of Akyem

The Akyem Abuakwa created the Akuapem state out of the greater half of western portion of the former Akwamu state and it included the Aburi, Berekuso, Abiriw, Apirede and Larte areas. Ofori Dua, brother of Ofori Panin, became Omanhene of the Akuapem state. The Akyem Abuakwa traditional area is now commonly referred to as Okyeman.

During the reign of the great warrior king (Adontehene) of the Akyems, Nana Owusu Akyem Tenten, who was also known as the "Kwae-Bibirimhene" (King of the Dense Forest), the Guan ethnic group and the Dawu ethnic group appealed to him for help to drive the Akwamus out of their area for them to enjoy peace.

The Akyems were mercenaries during that time period and were known for helping neighbouring states fight off the middle men of the slave trade and adjoining states in other battles that were in the interest of the Akyem states' ultimate objective of remaining strong and independent. Nana Owusu Akyem Tenten (King of the Dense Forest) agreed to send his nephew a respected soldier, Odehyee Safori, with an army. They were victorious over the Akwamu again these battles and created the states of Akropong and Amanokrom.
Safori pursued the Akwamus across the River Volta, where they settled up until the present day, with their capital at Akwamufie.

By 1740 the power within the coast was as follows: the Akyem firmly controlling a majority of the Eastern portion of the coastal area; with the Fante, Asante and Ahanta controlling the rest.

Post 1740

After 1740 the Akyem control of the coast was tentative and disagreements among the Akyem states weakened them. Also starting around this time, key areas on the coast were constantly being battled for with the Ashanti until 1816 when the Ashanti firmly established itself on the Eastern half of what became the Gold Coast in the former Akwamu State which the Akyem had won almost a century earlier. This was mainly due to a battle of attrition were the Akyem were out numbered. In the end, the Ashanti inherited some of the lands which had been won from the Akwamu including access to the coastal lands which essentially established the Asante empire as the most power state in the region which controlled all trade from the interior to the Coast. The Akim retreated back to their historic lands in what is now the Eastern Region of Ghana. To conclude, the Akyem are most famous because of the Akan states that existed before the rise of the empire of Ashanti the Akyem states remained the most independent and remained the most relevant.

J. K. Fynn writes:

The Asante bid for supremacy, however was violently opposed by older Akans states whose kings refused to accept the pretensions and claims of what they considered an upstart dynasty. Of these Akan states, Akyem resistance to Asante political domination was not only persistent but also it was nearly the most successful.

The Akyem during this tentative period between 1750 and 1816 still continued to show their ability to influence matters and act as Mercenaries helping those being oppressed by stronger states. This was demonstrated by helping the Ada, who were being oppressed by the Anlo, and defeating them in the battle of Nonombe around 1752,

The Ashanti-Akyem relationship post-1816 continued to grow into one of mutual respect that still exists in recent times. A common saying among the Akans is, “Okyenhene nko ara na Osantehene ne no di nsawoso”, meaning literally: “The King of Ashanti treats none but the King of Akyem on familiar terms.” This is due to the fact that the Akyem were strong and relatively independent during the peak of the Ashanti empire when compared to neighbours.

Post-1816
Post-1816 the Akyem enjoyed relative peace in their current location today and all of what became Ghana was under British rule by the early 20th century.

Nana Dokua era 

The Nana Dokua era was known as an era of peace and prosperity due to her way of solving problems.
History has it that during the reign of the famous Nana Dokua (Abirie) as both okyehene (king) and ohemaa (queenmother), a quarrel arose between her and the Kotokuhene at that time. As a result, she ordered part of the Amantomiensa (soldiers of the Paramount stool), the Asiakwahene (King of Asiakwa area of Akyem) and the Begorohene (King of Begoro area of Akyem), to remove the Kotokus from Gyadam. This war, known as the "Gyadam War", forced the Kotoku to leave Gyadam. The Kwabenghene allowed them a safe passage and not a shot was fired when they passed through Kwabeng. The Kotokuhene was given land by the then chief of Wankyi, Barimah Awire (the Oseawuohene (Chief of Oseawuo area of Akyem Abuakwa) to settle at what is now known as Oda, the capital of Akyem Kotoku state.

During the reign of Nana Dokua, a section of the Juabens of Ashanti revolted against the Golden Stool of Ashanti. The rebels, led by their chief, Nana Kwaku Boateng, were forced to leave Juaben in Ashanti for the south. They found settlement at Kyebi, Kwabeng, Tafo, Asamankese and other parts of Akyem Abuakwa. Later, when the trouble in Juaben subsided, some of them returned to Ashanti but came back again. On the third occasion a negotiating settlement on their behalf was met and with the consent of both the Kukurantumihene (the Adontehee of Akyem Abuakwa), Nana Kwaku Abrante and Okyehene Nana Dokua,  the Juabens got land. They settled on it under the leadership and rule of their chief, Nana Kwaku Boateng, calling the area New Juaben, with Koforidua as its capital. An annual fee was agreed to be paid to the Akyem this practice continued until Dr. Kwame Nkrumah abolished it after independence.

Akyem people of today

Pre and post colonially, the Akyem have been very involved in the intellectual and pan-African ideology that made Ghana unique among its peers. Several of the political and educated elite were of Akyem descent. This influence continues today in modern Ghana. The Akyem have been assimilated under the common Ghanaian identity where ethnicity does not play a role as it does in other countries.

Rulers of Akyem 
List of rulers of the Akan state of Akyem Abuakwa (1500 – present)

List of rulers of the Akan state of Akyem Kotoku (1400 – present)

List of rulers of the Akan state of Akyem Bosume (1818 – present)

Ohum Festival
The traditional area of the Akyem is sometimes known as Kwaebibirim or the "Birim Forest" because of its abundance in rich natural resources. This area is in the tropical rain forest with fertile river valleys, deep loamy soil, and fresh fauna. The land is watered by the famous river Birim. The river Birim is the source of Ghana's diamond. The spiritual, physical and philosophical sustenance of the Akyem people are derived from river Birim. The Akyem do not worship the river per se, they revere it as their source of inspiration, giving them life and strength.

During the Ohum Festival, Akyems thank the creator for blessing their land with such a magnificent river (Birim). The products from the Akyems land and river are symbols which are used to remember ancestors who struggled and persevered to keep the society intact. During the festival the descendants pledge to continue the tradition, to keep Okyeman strong and free with peace and prosperity. They then pledge allegiance to their King (Okyehene) and their sub-chiefs and elders for their leadership and guidance. The Ohum festival is celebrated in Akyem Abuakwa in two parts: the Ohumkan and the Ohumkyire. The Ohum festival is celebrated with the chief and people of Akyem Tafo visiting the Gyempremo shrine to perform rituals and make sacrifices to the deity. Legend has it that any person who trips and falls on the return journey from the Gyempremo shrine will not live to see the new year. On the Ohum Tuesday, it is forbidden to make any noise including the pounding of fufu, the main staple diet of the Akan people till dusk.

Art

Religion
Akyem Practice  Traditional Religion through their ancestors.

See also
Akan people
Akyem Abuakwa
Akyem Kotoku
Akyem Bosome

References

Giving Akyem History Its Due. Robert Addo-Fening, The Journal of African History, Vol. 43, No. 2 (2002), pp. 324–326. Published by Cambridge University Press

Akan people
Ethnic groups in Ghana